Jean-Claude Cros (born 1942) is a French former rugby league player, who played as fullback.

Biography 
Cros played for Albi and then for Lézignan Sangliers during his career. He also represented France in the 1968 Rugby League World Cup, playing in the last match against Australia.
In 1972, Cros had to end his career at the age of 30 years due to an injury to a collarbone before a match against his former club, Albi.

Honours

Honours 

 Rugby league :
 World Cup :
 Runner-up 1968 (France).

Caps

Cap details

References

External links
 

1942 births
Living people
France national rugby league team players
French rugby league players
Lézignan Sangliers players
Racing Club Albi XIII players
Rugby league fullbacks